After Midnight is a 1927 American silent drama film written and directed by Monta Bell. The film stars Norma Shearer and Gwen Lee. A copy of After Midnight is housed at the Cinémathèque Française.

Synopsis
A story of New York's nightlife: Mary (Norma Shearer) is a cabaret hostess with a heart of gold and her sister Maizie (Gwen Lee) is a gold-digger with no heart.

Cast
 Norma Shearer as Mary Miller
 Lawrence Gray as Joe Miller
 Gwen Lee as Maizie
 Eddie Sturgis as Red Smith
 Philip Sleeman as Gus Van Gundy

References

External links
 
 
 Lobby poster at Flickr

1927 films
1927 drama films
Silent American drama films
American silent feature films
Metro-Goldwyn-Mayer films
American black-and-white films
1920s American films